Tomáš Břečka (born 12 May 1994) is a Czech professional footballer who plays as a centre back for Slovácko.

Club career
He made his senior league debut for Slovácko on 31 May 2014, in a Czech First League 0–2 home loss against Teplice. He scored his first league goal on 29 November 2014, in a Czech First League 2–1 away win at Bohemians 1905.

On 2 September 2022, Břečka returned to Slovácko with a three-year contract.

References

External links 
 
 Tomáš Břečka official international statistics
 
 Tomáš Břečka profile on the 1. FC Slovácko official website

1994 births
People from Kroměříž
Sportspeople from the Zlín Region
Living people
Czech footballers
Czech Republic under-21 international footballers
Association football defenders
1. FC Slovácko players
FK Jablonec players
Kasımpaşa S.K. footballers
Czech First League players
Süper Lig players
Czech expatriate footballers
Czech expatriate sportspeople in Turkey
Expatriate footballers in Turkey